Generic access  may refer to:

 Generic Access Network
 Generic access profile